Arnold Diamond (18 April 1915 – 18 March 1992) was an English character actor, regularly cast in small parts on television.

He graduated from  RADA in 1936, and his stage work included the RSC, and three years in Agatha Christie's The Mousetrap in the West End (1954-1957). In a long career, he was cast in a variety of roles, but frequently in 'foreigner' roles, and often as policemen. Indeed, his most remembered role is probably that of Colonel Latignant in the 1960s ITC series The Saint with Roger Moore. The character of Latignant was one of the few recurring characters in the series' long run. 

Towards the end of his career he appeared in the BBC comedy series In Sickness and in Health as Mr Rabinsky, Alf Garnett's Jewish tight neighbour with a black hat and long beard.

Selected filmography

Snowbound (1948) - Italian Hotel Guest (uncredited)
The Spider and the Fly (1949) - Police Officer (uncredited)
Cairo Road (1950) - Police Major
Circle of Danger (1951) - Geronimo's Waiter (uncredited)
Mantrap (1953) - Alphonse
South of Algiers (1953) - Spahi Officer
Forbidden Cargo (1954) - French Customs Officer (uncredited)
Five Days (1954) - Perkins (uncredited)
The Constant Husband (1955) - Car Loan Manager (uncredited)
Othello (1956) - Iago (English version, voice)
The Hideout (1956) - Zacki
Time Without Pity (1957) - Third Journalist
Don Quixote (1957) - Don Quixote (English version, voice, uncredited)
The Duke Wore Jeans (1958) - MC
Dunkirk (1958) - Constable (uncredited)
The Revenge of Frankenstein (1958) - Molke
Carry On Sergeant (1958) - Fifth Specialist
Bobbikins (1959) - LeFarge
Hand in Hand (1960) - Mr. Mathias
Carry On Constable (1960) - Chief Constable (voice, uncredited)
The Hands of Orlac (1960) - Dresser (uncredited)
The Breaking Point (1961) - Telling
The Frightened City (1961) - Moffat
It's Trad, Dad! (1962) - TV Panelist
Two Letter Alibi (1962) - Ballistics Expert
Masters of Venus (1962) - Imos
The Switch (1963) - Jean Lecraze
Paranoiac (1963) - Publican
Maniac (1963) - Janiello
Return from the Ashes (1965) - Neighbour
A Man Could Get Killed (1966) - Milo
The Spy with a Cold Nose (1966) - Agent in Water Wagon
The Vulture (1966) - (uncredited)
Casino Royale (1967) - Russian Officer (uncredited)
The Anniversary (1968) - Headwaiter
The Girl on a Motorcycle (1968) - French Customs Officer
Isadora (1968) - (uncredited)
The File of the Golden Goose (1969) - Pollard
The Best House in London (1969) - Charles Dickens
The Italian Job (1969) - Senior Computer Room Official
Run a Crooked Mile (1969, TV Movie) - Swiss News Agent
Doppelgänger (1969) - Paris EuroSEC Representative (uncredited)
All the Way Up (1970) - Manager 'Bella Capri'
Zeppelin (1971) - Major Proudfoot
Puppet on a Chain (1971) - Coroner (uncredited)
Fiddler on the Roof (1971) - Moishe
Madame Sin (1972) - Lengetti
Young Winston (1972) - Officer (uncredited)
The Alf Garnett Saga (1972) - Policeman
Our Miss Fred (1972) - German C.O.
Steptoe and Son (1973) - 'The Party' Christmas Special
Don't Just Lie There, Say Something! (1974) - Priest
The Bawdy Adventures of Tom Jones (1976) - Noisy Reveller
March or Die (1977) - Husband
Revenge of the Pink Panther (1978) - Douvier's Board member
Quincy's Quest (1979) - Manager
The Great Riviera Bank Robbery (1979) - Town Hall Man
Avalanche Express (1979) - (uncredited)
Omen III: The Final Conflict (1981) - Astronomer
Venom (1981) - Head Waiter
Anastasia: The Mystery of Anna (1986) - Dr. Markov

References

External links

1915 births
1992 deaths
English male stage actors
English male film actors
English male television actors
Jewish English male actors
Alumni of RADA
Road incident deaths in England
People from West Ham